The Johor State Executive Council is the executive authority of the Government of Johor, Malaysia. The Council comprises the Menteri Besar, appointed by the Sultan on the basis that he is able to command a majority in the Johor State Legislative Assembly, a number of members made up of members of the Assembly, the State Secretary, the State Legal Adviser and the State Financial Officer.

This Council is similar in structure and role to the Cabinet of Malaysia, while being smaller in size. As federal and state responsibilities differ, there are a number of portfolios that differ between the federal and state governments.

Members of the Council are selected by the Menteri Besar, appointed by the Sultan. The Council has no ministry, but instead a number of committees; each committee will take care of certain state affairs, activities and departments. Members of the Council are always the chair of a committee.

Ex officio members

Lists of full members

Onn Hafiz EXCO (since 2022) 

Members since 15 March 2022 have been:

Hasni EXCO (2020–2022) 

Members from 28 February 2020 to 15 March 2022 were :

Sahruddin EXCO (2019–2020)

Osman EXCO (2018–2019)

Khaled EXCO (2013–2018)

See also 
 Sultan of Johor
 List of Menteris Besar of Johor
 Johor State Legislative Assembly

References

External links 
 Johor State Government

Politics of Johor
Johor